The Kiesinger cabinet was the 8th Government of the Federal Republic of Germany from 1 December 1966 to 22 October 1969 throughout the 5th legislative session of the Bundestag. It was led by the Christian Democratic Union's Kurt Georg Kiesinger, a former Nazi Party member. The Bundestag that had been chosen in the September 1965 election initially resulted in the Cabinet Erhard II, but when the Free Democratic Party resigned from the government, that led to the formation of the new cabinet. The cabinet was supported by the first grand coalition between the Christian Democratic Union (CDU), Christian Social Union of Bavaria (CSU) and the Social Democratic Party (SPD). The Vice-Chancellor was Willy Brandt (SPD)

Composition

|}

References

Kiesinger
1966 establishments in West Germany
1969 disestablishments in West Germany
Cabinets established in 1966
Cabinets disestablished in 1969
Coalition governments of Germany
Kurt Georg Kiesinger